Klang High School or classically known as the High School Klang (Abbreviation: HSK or STK; Bahasa Malaysia: SMK Tinggi Klang; simplified Chinese: 巴生高等中学; pinyin: Bā Shēng Gāo Děng Zhong Xué, Tamil: கிள்ளான் உயர்நிலை பள்ளி) is a Malaysian national secondary school located at Jalan Meru about one km away from the Klang city centre in Selangor, Malaysia. It is situated beside the Klang District Education Office. It is a male-only school from Form 1 to Form 5. At the Sixth Form level, where students take their STPM, the classes have both male and female. Klang High School was one of the top-performing schools in Selangor during the British governance and until today, it is still among the respected schools in Selangor. Since its establishment, the school has produced numerous talents serving for the nation and overseas. In Klang, it is one of the most reputable schools known among Klang people.

History
Klang High School was originally named Temporary English School and was open to students in Klang on 14 January 1928 with the beginning of the academic school year. At the beginning, the school conducted the class in a small hut at the current sports field of the school. English  was  taught  to  a small  multi-cultural  group  of  junior high school  students. 

The British government could feel the need of English education for this local community in Klang. Thus, after gaining approval from the British central government in Malaya, the school was given better facilities by the British government, particularly the buildings currently named "Block A" and "Block B".
The main school block (Block A) was officiated by the Sultan of Selangor on 20 March 1930.

During the World War II, the  small school  struggled  to  remain  open  on  a  regular  basis and in 1941, it was used by the British as the headquarters of the Medical Auxiliary Service for Klang. There were two doctors assisted by 52 nurses. However, the school went into ruin when the Japanese army invaded Klang. Innocent civilians serving the school were killed by the Japanese army and the school's facilities were damaged during the war. During the Japanese invasion, the school was used as a military base and also as medical camp. The school reopened after World War II having been used as a military hospital by the British Military Authority and the Japanese army.

After Malaysia's independence in 1957, it was known as Sekolah Tinggi Klang or by its acronym STK. By the end of the 1990s, the name was changed in accordance with Ministry of Education regulations to its current name, SMK Tinggi Klang.

Centennial celebration
The year 2028 will mark the 100th anniversary since the establishment of the Klang High School in year 1928. The name of the school and its  reincarnations  has been a legend among many generations in Klang and Selangor. A grand celebration is expected in the year 2028. The administration, teachers, students, parents and old boys / alumni will help in organising the grand celebration of its 100th anniversary that year.

School buildings
The school has thirteen blocks and one multipurpose hall. The blocks are named below, with the year each came into use:
 1928Hospital block. Later used as the laboratories (Block B)
 1930Main block (Block A)
 1948Block H and I
 1961Afternoon session laboratories (Block F)
 1969School Library (Block G)
 1972Biology, physics and chemistry laboratories (Block D)
 1980Physics and chemistry laboratories with the staff room (Block C)
 1982Block E
 1991New block for sixth form classes (Block J)
 2001New twin blocks (Block K & L)
 2002New multipurpose hall (Dewan Putra)
 2003Computer laboratory (Block M)
 2007Teachers' Quarter 1 (Block N)
 2009Teachers' Quarter 2 (Block O)

Facilities
 Assembly Square (Dataran High School)
 Basketball Court
 Tennis Court and Volleyball Court
 Library
 Computer Laboratory
 Surau Luqman al-Hakim
 Mini Museum and Gallery
 Living Skill Workshops
 Hall and Badminton Court (Dewan Putra)
 Old Hall (Balai Warisan)
 Multipurpose Field
 Hostel for Students (Asrama Putra)
 Science Laboratories
 Visual Art Workshop
 Prefects' Chamber
 Discipline Stop-Centers
 Fish Pond
 Teachers' Quarters
 Band Room
 Treatment Room
 Three Canteens (Canteen A, B & C)
 Book Stall
 School Cooperative Stall

School anthem

Probitas Et Fides
O God almighty, we give thee thanksFor our school, the High School Klang
And for the teachers who daily guide usWith the answers to questions asked

Onward the spirit of close fellowshipAnd towards others in friendship and love
May we never be found wantingThe great courage of living and striving

Dear High School KlangOur High School Klang
Thee our dear Alma MaterForward to serve we go now
''May we love thee forever more

Principals
  S.C.E. Singam (1928–1929)
  P.V. Ponniah (1930-1931)
  D. Roper (1932)
  P.F. Howitt (1934)
  H.R. Carey (1936)
  E.R. Davies (1937)
  C.W Bloomfield (1939)
  E.F. Pearson (1940)
  V.K. Chinniah (1941-1945)
  C.W. Jackman (1946)
  M. Campbell (1947)
  T.K. Taylor (1948)
  W. Burton (1950)
  K. Arianayagam (1951–1952)
  F.J. Rawcliffe (1953)
  A. Williamson (1955)
  N. Francis (1957)
  J.M.B. Hughes (1957–1958)
  C. Slowe (1958)
  R.A. Wilson (1959)
  Chye Kooi Ngan (1959)
  Lee Mun Yui (1963- April 1963)
  Wahidullah Khan (April 1968)
  Austin Hooi (1969–1971)
  Victor Gopal (1971–1973)
  Foong See Tonn (1973–1982)
  Zorkamain Abdul Rahman (June 1982 – 1985)
  Haji Abdul Raof Hussin (1985–1987)
  Kamaruddin Mansur (February 1988 – 1993)
  Dr. Abdul Karim Md. Nor (1993-1994)
  Haji Ani Sujak (1996–1997)
  Haji Salihuddin Mohd. Said (1998–2001)
 Madam Hajah Siti Aishah Abdullah (2001–2005)
 Madam Hajah Sriyati Abdul Manan (2005–2009)
 Haji Najib (2009)
 Madam Hajah Huzaimah (2010-2012)
 Madam Hajah Laila Ibrahim (2012-2014)
 Yang Mulia Hajah Raja Rozita Raja Hanafi (2014-2020)
 Tn. Haji Abdul Hakim Samuri (2021 - current)

School's Old Boys
 Tan Sri Datuk Krishnan Tan Boon Seng (current)

External links
 Official School Website
 26092011 News on the School's Prefectorial Board

Secondary schools in Malaysia
Schools in Selangor